= Herm Steger =

American politician (1926–2013)

Member of the Idaho House of Representatives
- In office 1987–1992

Personal details
- Born: August 26, 1926
- Died: December 28, 2013 (aged 87)
- Party: Republican

Herm Steger (August 26, 1926 – December 28, 2013) was an American politician. He served as a Republican member of the Idaho House of Representatives.

== Life and career ==
Steger was a school principal.

Steger served in the Idaho House of Representatives from 1987 to 1992.

Steger died in 2013.
